N-Vinylpyrrolidone (NVP) is an organic compound consisting of a 5-membered lactam linked to a vinyl group.  It is a colorless liquid although commercial samples can appear yellowish.

It is produced industrially by vinylation of 2-pyrrolidone, i.e. the base-catalyzed reaction with acetylene. It is the precursor to polyvinylpyrrolidone (PVP), an important synthetic material. The NVP monomer is commonly used as a reactive diluent in ultraviolet and electron-beam curable polymers applied as inks, coatings or adhesives.

Synthesis
Starting from γ-Butyrolactone, 2-pyrrolidone is synthesized by treatment with ammonia. Subsequently, acetylene is used to introduce the vinyl group.

See also
 Methylpyrrolidone (NMP)
 2-Pyrrolidone (2-Py)

References

External links
 N-Vinyl-2-pyrrolidone

Amide solvents
Pyrrolidones
Vinyl compounds
Monomers
Reactive diluents